Vasallo or Vassallo is a surname of Spanish and Italian origin. Notable people with the surname include:

Aldenay Vasallo (born 1977), Cuban hammer thrower
Brigitte Vasallo (born 1973), Spanish writer
Carlos Vasallo (born 1950), Spanish businessman and audiovisual producer
Nicholas Vasallo (born 1979), American composer
Norma Vasallo Barrueta, sometimes known as Norma Vasallo, Cuban feminist researcher and academic

See also
Palacio Vasallo, government building in Argentina
VasalloVision, Spanish-language television network in the US.